Sycacantha escharota is a species of moth of the family Tortricidae first described by Edward Meyrick in 1910. It is found on the Indonesian islands of Sulawesi and Seram. The habitat consists of bamboo and secondary forests.

References

Moths described in 1910
Olethreutini
Sycacantha